Galium hallii (Hall's bedstraw) is a species of plants in the family Rubiaceae. It is known only from southern California: (Inyo, San Bernardino, Kern, Los Angeles, Ventura, Santa Barbara and Tulare Counties). It is dioecious, with male and female flowers on separate plants.

References

External links
Calphotos
Gardening Europe

hallii
Endemic flora of California
Plants described in 1923
Dioecious plants